The Padang or Singapore Cricket Club Ground is a cricket ground in Singapore. The Padang became a major recreational area when two clubs, the Singapore Cricket Club in 1870 and the Singapore Recreation Club in 1883 were established at both ends of the field. It was used for exercising horses in the 1920s and became the scene for the New Year sporting activities.

Cricket's development in the colony took a back seat due to the world wars, However, after World War II the ground played host to teams such as the touring Australians of 1959. In 2003 came the club was given the go-ahead to pursue extensive re-development to the cost of $17 million, the first change to its structure for nearly 120 years. Improvements include the appropriately named Stumps bar which boasts an outdoor seating area and views of the ground. Further modernisations have improved the gym and other sporting facilities, In 1996 Padang Cricket Ground became the first venue in Singapore to host One Day International (ODI's). The first ODI saw Pakistan play Sri Lanka in the 1995–96 Singer Cup. Four further ODIs were held during the tournament, which also involved India.

One Day International Matches

List of ODI matches hosted at this stadium

List of Centuries

One Day Internationals
Three One-day international century has been scored at Singapore Cricket Club Ground, Padang

References

External links 
 Cricinfo
 Cricketarchive

Cricket grounds in Singapore
Cricket in Singapore